Michael Lissack (born 1958) is an American business executive, author, business consultant and former director of the Institute for the Study of Coherence and Emergence. In 2019 Lissack was inducted into the International Academy for Systems and Cybernetic Sciences.

Lisack was managing director in the municipal bond department at Smith Barney, and came into prominence as the whistleblower, who exposed a yield burning scandal in the 1990s, whereby financial firms made illegal profits from the structuring of U.S. government investment portfolios associated with municipal bonds.

Biography 
Lissack received his BA in American Civilization and Political Economy in 1979 from Williams College, and his MPPM in Business from Yale University in 1981. Later in his career in 2000 Lissack received a doctor of business administration degree from Henley Management College in the United Kingdom.

After his graduation from Yale, Lissack started at Smith Barney, where he became managing director and served in this position until 1995. From 1999 - 2017 he was the director of the Institute for the Study of Coherence and Emergence. From 1999 to 2004, Lissack also served as the editor-in-chief of Emergence: A Journal of Complexity Issues in Organizations and Management now known as E:CO.

Lissack was a candidate for county commissioner in Collier County, Florida, in 2002 and in 2006. He briefly taught business and public policy at the Central European University. Lissack was the president of the American Society for Cybernetics from 2015-2020.

Work and controversies

Praise for Lissack 

In 1999 Worth Magazine described Lissack as one of "Wall Street's 25 smartest players" and as one of the 100 Americans who have most influenced "how we think about money" in 2001.

Yield burning scandal 

In 1994, Lissack exposed a major yield burning scandal on Wall Street.  The issue was eventually settled by a number of firms for over $200 million, to which Lissack was entitled to at least 15% per federal whistleblower laws. Lissack used some of these funds for charitable purposes including endowing a professorship in social responsibility and personal ethics at his alma mater, Williams College.

In February 1998, Lissack entered into a voluntary agreement with the U.S. Securities and Exchange Commission whereby he was banned from the securities industry for five years and paid a $30,000 fine, as part of an arrangement by Lissack's legal team for Lissack to be on record as taking some responsibility for the scandal.

In 1998 Lissack was charged by the Manhattan District Attorney's office with making online solicitations for people to harass executives of his former employer, Salmon Smith Barney, by calling them at company headquarters and in some instances their homes.  He pleaded guilty to second-degree harassment (a violation and lesser offense than the misdemeanor harassment charge with which he was originally charged ), admitting he sent phony e-mails to Salomon Smith Barney employees. The guilty plea was the result of "a prolonged feud between Smith Barney and Lissack over his whistle-blowing allegations of abuses by the firm and other participants in the $1.3 trillion municipal bond business". As part of the plea, Lissack was not sentenced to jail and paid no fine.

Stochastic Parrots controversy 
In February 2021 it was reported that Lissack engaged in a campaign against Timnit Gebru following her departure from Google including an extensive twitter campaign and emails to her and her supporters. Gebru was a co-author of a paper On the Dangers of Stochastic Parrots: Can Language Models Be Too Big? the publication of which resulted in her departure from Google.  Gebru stated that Lissack was stalking her and colleagues.  In consequence he was blocked for a period from Twitter for harassment. Lissack's response stated that his goal had been to ensure downloads of this critique of Gebru's co-authored paper which had resulted in her exit from Google. Jeff Dean, lead of Google's AI division, denied any connection with Lissack and asked him to cease making unsolicited contact with people on the subject, stating that "This kind of behavior has no place in scientific discourse".

Selected publications 
Lissack has written or co-authored a number of books, a selection: including 
 Lissack, Michael, and Johan Roos. The next common sense; Mastering corporate complexity through (2000).
 Lissack, Michael R. Managing complexity in organizations: A view in many directions. IAP, 2005.

Articles, a selection
 Lissack, Michael R. "Complexity: the science, its vocabulary, and its relation to organizations." Emergence 1.1 (1999): 110-126.
 Richardson, Kurt A., Paul Cilliers, and Michael Lissack. "Complexity Science." Emergence 3.2 (2001): 6-18.
 Lissack, Michael, and Johan Roos. "Be coherent, not visionary." Long Range Planning 34.1 (2001): 53-70.

Books 
In 1999 Lissack published The Next Common Sense (1999) This work co-authored with Johan Roos presented the concepts of Identity, Landscape and Simple Guiding Principles. These principles were used to develop the Real-Time Strategy used in the first Lego Serious Play application.

In 2011 Lissack also authored the book Coherence in the Midst of Complexity.

References

Living people
1958 births
American business executives
American whistleblowers
Complex systems theory
American systems scientists